Vasile-Silviu Prigoană (born  December 22, 1963) is a Romanian businessman and politician.

He owns 60% of Rosal, a waste collection company which services Bucharest's Sector 3, Cluj-Napoca, Suceava, and Baia Mare.

In December 2008, he became a member of the Romanian Chamber of Deputies, serving for four years. He was a member of the Democratic Liberal Party (PDL) until September 2012, shortly before his term expired.

Apart from his waste collection company, Prigoană is known for founding the first Romanian news television, Realitatea TV, the first sports channel based in Romania, TV Sport (later sold to Central European Media Enterprises, becoming Sport.ro), and two other music channels: the first with emphasis on Romanian traditional music, Etno TV, and the other known for promoting Manele music, Taraf TV.

His first wife, Viorica, died in 1994 at age 30. He is married to Adriana Bahmuțeanu with whom he had a tumultuous relationship that culminated with their fourth marriage in May 2009. The couple have two children together, along with two sons from his first marriage, Honorius-Adrian and Silvius.

References

External links 

  Personal site

1963 births
Living people
People from Gherla
Members of the Chamber of Deputies (Romania)
Democratic Liberal Party (Romania) politicians